The eleventh season of the Nickelodeon sketch-comedy series All That aired from June 15, 2019 to December 17, 2020. This season marked the first time the show had aired new episodes since 2005. Former cast members Kenan Thompson and Kel Mitchell served as executive producers. Like the first 10 seasons, this season was shot before a live audience.

The eleventh season featured the involvement of former cast members appearing regularly with the new cast in sketches. Numerous classic characters and sketches, such as Good Burger, the "Loud Librarian", and "Detective Dan", were revived for the new season. Besides Mitchell and Thompson's involvement; Lori Beth Denberg, Josh Server, Alisa Reyes, Mark Saul, Jamie Lynn Spears, and Lisa Foiles have returned.

Cast

Starring
 Ryan Alessi
 Reece Caddell
 Kate Godfrey
 Gabrielle Nevaeh Green
 Nathan Janak
 Lex Lumpkin
 Chinguun Sergelen

Notes

Featuring
 Aria Brooks (first episode: January 18, 2020)

Production
In the fall of 2018, Brian Robbins, co-creator of the series, was formally announced as the new president of Nickelodeon. Now in charge of the company's programming unit, he expressed interest in a revival of the show. By November 2018, Robbins met with original cast member Kenan Thompson in New York where he performs in the cast of Saturday Night Live.

The show's second revival was announced as part of Nickelodeon's 2019 content slate on February 14, 2019.

On May 14, 2019, it was announced that the show would premiere on June 15, 2019. The new cast was officially revealed on Today with Hoda & Jenna on May 29, 2019.

On October 16, 2019, it was announced that Nickelodeon had ordered 13 additional episodes for the season, bringing the total to 26 episodes. It was also announced that Aria Brooks would be joining the cast for the new episodes.

On November 21, 2019, it was revealed that Jamie Lynn Spears and the cast of Zoey 101 would be reuniting in a Thelma Stump sketch, in an episode aired on July 11, 2020, which also doubled as All Thats 200th episode.

On February 19, 2020, it was announced that Nickelodeon had ordered an additional 10 episodes for the season. However, on March 16, 2020, Nickelodeon postponed all live-action productions due to the COVID-19 pandemic. Only eight of those episodes were completed, and production did not resume.

Episodes

Notes

References

2019 American television seasons
All That seasons